The 29th Independent Spirit Awards, honoring the best independent films of 2013, were presented on March 1, 2014. The nominations were announced on November 27, 2013. The ceremony was hosted by Patton Oswalt.

Winners and nominees

{| class="wikitable"
!Best Feature
!Best Director
|-
| 12 Years a Slave
 All Is Lost
 Frances Ha
 Inside Llewyn Davis
 Nebraska
| Steve McQueen – 12 Years a Slave
 Shane Carruth – Upstream Color
 J. C. Chandor – All Is Lost
 Jeff Nichols – Mud
 Alexander Payne – Nebraska
|-
!Best Male Lead
!Best Female Lead
|-
| Matthew McConaughey – Dallas Buyers Club as Ron Woodroof
 Bruce Dern – Nebraska as Woodrow "Woody" Grant
 Chiwetel Ejiofor – 12 Years a Slave as Solomon Northup
 Oscar Isaac – Inside Llewyn Davis as Llewyn Davis
 Michael B. Jordan – Fruitvale Station as Oscar Grant III
 Robert Redford – All Is Lost as Our Man
| Cate Blanchett – Blue Jasmine as Jeanette "Jasmine" Francis
 Julie Delpy – Before Midnight as Céline
 Gaby Hoffmann – Crystal Fairy as Crystal Fairy
 Brie Larson – Short Term 12 as Grace Howard
 Shailene Woodley – The Spectacular Now as Aimee Finecky
|-
!Best Supporting Male
!Best Supporting Female
|-
| Jared Leto – Dallas Buyers Club as Rayon
 Michael Fassbender – 12 Years a Slave as Edwin Epps
 Will Forte – Nebraska as David Grant
 James Gandolfini – Enough Said as Albert
 Lakeith Stanfield – Short Term 12 as Marcus
| Lupita Nyong'o – 12 Years a Slave as Patsey
 Melonie Diaz – Fruitvale Station as Sophina Mesa
 Sally Hawkins – Blue Jasmine as Ginger
 Yolonda Ross – Go for Sisters as Fontayne
 June Squibb – Nebraska as Kate Grant
|-
!Best Screenplay
!Best First Screenplay
|-
| John Ridley – 12 Years a Slave
 Woody Allen – Blue Jasmine
 Julie Delpy, Ethan Hawke, and Richard Linklater – Before Midnight
 Nicole Holofcener – Enough Said
 Scott Neustadter and Michael H. Weber – The Spectacular Now
| Bob Nelson – Nebraska
 Lake Bell – In a World...
 Joseph Gordon-Levitt – Don Jon
 Jill Soloway – Afternoon Delight
 Michael Starrbury – The Inevitable Defeat of Mister & Pete
|-
!Best First Feature
!Best Documentary Feature
|-
| Fruitvale Station – Director: Ryan Coogler; Producers: Nina Yang Bongiovi and Forest Whitaker Blue Caprice – Director/Producer: Alexandre Moors; Producers: Kim Jackson, Brian O'Carroll, Isen Robbins, Will Rowbotham, Aimee Schoof, Ron Simons, and Stephen Tedeschi
 Concussion – Director: Stacie Passon; Producer: Rose Troche
 Una Noche – Director/Producer: Lucy Mulloy; Producers: Sandy Pérez Aguila, Maite Artieda, Daniel Mulloy, and Yunior Santiago
 Wadjda – Director: Haifaa al-Mansour; Producers: Gerhard Meixner and Roman Pau
| 20 Feet from Stardom – Director/Producer: Morgan Neville; Producers: Gil Friesen and Caitrin Rogers The Act of Killing – Director/Producer: Joshua Oppenheimer; Producers: Joram Ten Brink, Christine Cynn, Anne Köhncke, Signe Byrge Sørensen, and Michael Uwemedimo
 After Tiller – Directors/Producers: Martha Shane and Lana Wilson
 Gideon's Army – Director/Producer: Dawn Porter; Producer: Julie Goldman
 The Square – Director: Jehane Noujaim; Producer: Karim Amer
|-
!Best Cinematography
!Best Editing
|-
| Sean Bobbitt – 12 Years a Slave
 Benoît Debie – Spring Breakers
 Bruno Delbonnel – Inside Llewyn Davis
 Frank G. DeMarco – All Is Lost
 Matthias Grunsky – Computer Chess
| Nat Sanders – Short Term 12
 Shane Carruth and David Lowery – Upstream Color
 Jem Cohen and Marc Vives – Museum Hours
 Jennifer Lame – Frances Ha
 Cindy Lee – Una Noche
|-
! colspan="2"| Best International Film
|-
| colspan="2"| Blue Is the Warmest Colour (France) – Director: Abdellatif Kechiche Gloria (Chile) – Director: Sebastián Lelio
 The Great Beauty (Italy) – Director: Paolo Sorrentino
 The Hunt (Denmark) – Director: Thomas Vinterberg
 A Touch of Sin (China) – Director: Jia Zhangke
|}

Films with multiple nominations and awards

Special awards

John Cassavetes AwardThis Is Martin Bonner – Writer/Director: Chad Hartigan; Producer: Cherie Saulter Computer Chess – Writer/Director: Andrew Bujalski; Producers: Houston King and Alex Lipschultz
 Crystal Fairy – Writer/Director: Sebastián Silva; Producers: Juan de Dios Larraín and Pablo Larraín
 Museum Hours – Writer/Director: Jem Cohen; Producers: Paolo Calamita and Gabriele Kranzelbinder
 Pit Stop – Writer/Director: Yen Tan; Writer: David Lowery; Producers: Jonathan Duffy, James M. Johnston, Eric Steele, and Kelly Williams

Truer Than Fiction AwardJason Osder – Let the Fire Burn
 Kalyanee Mam – A River Changes Course
 Stephanie Spray and Pacho Velez – Manakamana

Piaget Producers Award
Toby Halbrooks and James M. Johnston
 Jacob Jaffke
 Andrea Roa
 Frederick Thornton

Someone to Watch Award
Newlyweeds – Director: Shaka King The Foxy Merkins – Director: Madeleine Olnek
 My Sister's Quinceañera – Director: Aaron Douglas Johnston

Robert Altman Award
(The award is given to its film director, casting director, and ensemble cast)

 Mud – Jeff Nichols, Francine Maisler, Joe Don Baker, Jacob Lofland, Matthew McConaughey, Ray McKinnon, Sarah Paulson, Michael Shannon, Sam Shepard, Tye Sheridan, Paul Sparks, Bonnie Sturdivant, and Reese Witherspoon

Bright Future Award
Patrick Creadon – If You Build It

References

External links
 2014 Awards at IMDb

2013
Independent Spirit Awards